Burgruine Dobra is a castle in Lower Austria, Austria.

See also
List of castles in Austria

References

This article was initially translated from the German Wikipedia.

Castles in Lower Austria